Anterior ethmoidal may refer to:

 Anterior ethmoidal artery
 Anterior ethmoidal foramen
 Anterior ethmoidal vein